The 2008 Magyar Kupa, is the 82nd edition of the tournament.

Quarter-finals

Quarter-final matches were played on 27 and 28 September 2008.

|}

Final four
The final four will be held on 29 and 30 November 2008 at the Bitskey Aladár Uszoda in Eger.

Semi-finals

Final

See also
 2008–09 Országos Bajnokság I

External links
 Hungarian Water Polo Federaration 

Seasons in Hungarian water polo competitions
Hungary
Magyar Kupa